The Tutong River is a river in Tutong District, Brunei. It is the second longest of the four main rivers in the country.

Sites 
Tutong Town is one of the largest human settlements in the district in which the river passes through, and it has a small commercial jetty used by locals. At the mouth of the river, it links up with Sungai Danau which also has its own former jetty in Kampong Danau. Several more kampongs such as Lubok Pulau, Nyanyag, Tanjong Maya, Layong and Rambai also lies upstream of the river.

Some of Brunei's historical sites are located along the river banks, including:

 Kuala Tutong old ferry jetty, used significantly especially in the 1950s, to get across from Danau to Tutong.
 Kuala Tutong Mosque, built in 1993.
 Hassanal Bolkiah Mosque, built in 1966.
 Istana Pantai, an istana built in 1950.

Several islands located within the river included Bakuku, Setawat and Tanjong Maya. The river ends at the Laden Hill Forest Reserve.

See also 

 List of rivers of Brunei
 Tutong Town

References 

Rivers of Brunei